Crossflow may refer to:

 Ford Crossflow, the 1967 version of the Ford Kent engine
 Crossflow cylinder head
 Cross-flow fan, a type of mechanical fan
 Cross-flow filtration, a filtration technique
 Cross-flow turbine, a type of water (or air) turbine